Luigi Ruffo-Scilla JUD (25 August 1750 – 17 November 1832) was a Cardinal of the Holy Roman Church who served as Apostolic Nuncio to Austria and Archbishop of Naples.

Early life and priesthood
Luigi Ruffo-Scilla was born in Sant'Onofrio, in Calabria. He was the son of Guglielmo Ruffo, Prince of Scilla, and Lucrezia Reggio, of the princes of Campoflorito and Aci. He was educated at La Sapienza University, Rome, where he earned a doctorate in utroque iure (i.e., in both canon and civil law) on 3 December 1772.

He was ordained to the priesthood on 20 May 1780. He worked as a relator of the S.C. of the Good Government and of the Sacred Consulta.

Episcopate
He was appointed Titular Archbishop of Apamea on 11 April 1785 and was consecrated on 24 April 1785. He was served as Nuncio in the Grand Duchy of Tuscany from 26 April 1785 until 1793. He was Nuncio to Austria from 23 August 1793 until 9 August 1802.

Cardinalate
He was created and proclaimed Cardinal-Priest of San Martino ai Monti in the consistory of 23 February 1801. He was appointed as metropolitan archbishop of the see of Naples on 9 August.

On 26 May 1806 he was expelled from his see by the French and relegated to the fortress of Gaeta. In 1809, he was sent to Paris and then confined in Saint-Quentin from 1810 to 1813. (He was one of the "black cardinals" prohibited by Emperor Napoleon I from wearing red cardinal's robes). In 1813, he was sent to Fontainebleau. He  was later reunited with Pope Pius VII and other cardinals in the castle of Savona. He returned to Naples on 10 June 1815.

He participated in the conclave of 1823, which elected Pope Leo XII. He participated also in the conclave of 1829, which elected Pope Pius VIII, and in the conclave of 1830-1831, which elected Pope Gregory XVI.

He died in 1832, while still serving as archbishop of Naples at the age of 82.

References

1750 births
1832 deaths
19th-century Italian cardinals
Apostolic Nuncios to Austria
Archbishops of Naples
Luigi
19th-century Italian Roman Catholic archbishops
People from the Province of Vibo Valentia
Cardinals created by Pope Pius VII